Patersonia borneensis is a species of plant in the iris family Iridaceae and is endemic to a restricted area of Borneo. It is a tufted perennial with many leaves and pale lavender to bluish-purple tepals on a flowering stem shorter than the leaves.

Description
Flowering mainly occurs from December to April.

Taxonomy and naming
Patersonia borneensis was first described in 1894 by Otto Stapf in the Journal of the Linnean Society, Botany from specimens collected on Mount Kinabalu by George Darby Haviland in 1892.

Distribution and habitat

References

borneensis
Flora of Borneo
Plants described in 1894
Taxa named by Otto Stapf